Grace Dulais Davies (also known as Grace Gethin-Davies; born 1887 or 1888, Llangollen – September 30, 1969, Cardiff) was a winner of the Rose Mary Crawshay Prize (1918).

Grace Margaretta Dulais Davies was born in Llangollen in 1887 or 1888, the youngest child of Gethin Davies, principal of North Wales Baptist College, Bangor, and Rose Davies. She attended the Bangor County Girls' School (Ysgol Sirol y Genethod), and went on to obtain BA (1907) and MA (1916) degrees in English from the University of Wales.

She won the Rose Mary Crawshay Prize (1918) for her work titled Historical Fiction of the Eighteenth Century. She was a student at King's College, London at the time.

She was the Headmistress of Abergavenny County High School for Girls when she co-founded the Abergavenny Art Group in April 1937.

Davies died in Cardiff on 30 September 1969.

References

Bibliography 
 
 
 
 
 
 
 
 
 

Rose Mary Crawshay Prize winners
Alumni of the University of Wales
1969 deaths
British academics of English literature
People from Llangollen